The 2016 Waterford Senior Football Championship was the 129th edition of the Waterford GAA's premier club Gaelic football tournament for senior graded clubs in County Waterford, Ireland. The tournament consists of 12 teams, with the winner going on to represent Waterford in the Munster Senior Club Football Championship. The championship starts with a seeded group stage and then progresses to a knock out stage.

Stradbally were the defending champions after they defeated Abbeyside/Ballinacourty in the 2015 final, however, they relinquished their crown when Ballincourty defeated them at the semi-final stage.

This was Ballinameela's return to the senior grade.

On 6 November 2016, The Nire claimed their 8th S.F.C. title when defeating Ballinacourty 1-17 to 0-8 in the final in Fraher Field.

St. Saviour's were relegated to the 2017 I.F.C. after losing the Relegation Final and a remarkable 29 season stay in the top flight came to an end. During this period they claimed one S.F.C. title when defeating Kilrossanty in 1998 and were runners-up in 1988 when losing to the same opposition.

Team changes

The following teams have changed division since the 2015 championship season.

To S.F.C.
Promoted from I.F.C.
 Ballinameela – (Intermediate Champions)

From S.F.C.
Relegated to I.F.C.
 De La Salle

Group stage
All 12 teams enter the competition at this stage. The top 4 teams in both groups compete in four quarter-finals. The bottom team in each group contest the relegation play-off.

Group 1

Round 1
 Rathgormack 1-7, 0-8 Brickey Rangers, 9/4/2016,
 Stradbally 1-10, 1-5 Ballinameela, 9/4/2016,
 Kilrossanty 2-8, 1-8 Clashmore, 21/8/2016,

Round 2
 Kilrossanty 2-11, 1-7 Brickey Rangers, 16/4/2016,
 Stradbally 0-8, 0-4 Rathgormack, 19/4/2016,
 Clashmore 1-12, 0-7 Ballinameela, 19/4/2016,

Round 3
 Rathgormack 1-17, 0-7 Ballinameela, 25/6/2016,
 Clashmore 1-10, 0-9 Brickey Rangers, 3/9/2016
 Stradbally 1-13, 2-9 Kilrossanty, 4/9/2016,

Round 4
 Kilrossanty 1-12, 0-10 Rathgormack, 15/7/2016,
 Ballinameela 3-7, 0-15 Brickey Rangers, 29/7/2016,
 Stradbally 1-11, 0-11 Clashmore, 11/9/2016,

Round 5
 Clashmore 0-16, 1-3 Rathgormack, 14/10/2016,
 Kilrossanty 4-16, 0-4 Ballinameela 14/10/2016,
 Stradbally w/o, scr Brickey Rangers, 17/10/2016,

Group 2

Round 1
 Ballinacourty 1-10, 1-10 An Rinn, 15/4/2016,
 Ardmore 5-5, 2-12 St. Saviour's, 16/4/2016,
 The Nire 4-16, 1-7 Gaultier, 19/4/2016,

Round 2
 An Rinn 4-9, 1-9 Gaultier, 23/4/2016,
 St. Saviour's 3-7, 1-11 Ballinacourty, 23/4/2016,
 The Nire 2-18, 0-9 Ardmore, 22/8/2016,

Round 3
 Ardmore 2-12, 0-13 Gaultier, 23/6/2016,
 An Rinn 2-15, 0-9 St. Saviour's, 23/6/2016,
 Ballinacourty 2-13, 0-11 The Nire, 9/9/2016,

Round 4
 Gaultier 0-13, 0-6 St. Saviour's, 16/7/2016,
 Ballinacourty 1-15, 0-8 Ardmore, 30/7/2016,
 The Nire 2-13, 0-14 An Rinn, 3/9/2016,

Round 5
 The Nire 0-15, 1-5 St. Saviour's, 14/10/2016,
 An Rinn 2-10, 0-6 Ardmore, 14/10/2016,
 Ballinacourty 8-16, 0-6 Gaultier, 17/10/2016,

Knock-out stage

Last eight

Quarter-finals

Semi-finals

Final

Relegation play-off
Brickey Rangers 0-10 0-8 St. Saviour's, Leamybrien, 5/11/2016

Munster Senior Club Football Championship

References

Waterford Senior Football Championship
Waterford Senior Football Championship